Simoncito Silvera (born 20 August 1982) is a Venezuelan former track and field athlete who specialised in the 800 metres. He holds a personal best of 1:47.26 minutes for the distance. He is a four-time medallist at the South American Championships in Athletics, including 800 m bronze medals in 2001 and 2003. He won five national titles over 800 m from 1999 to 2005. He was a double bronze medallist at the 2004 Ibero-American Championships in Athletics.

Silvera enjoyed success with the Venezuelan men's 4 × 400 metres relay team, winning the gold medal at the 2001 South American Championships in Athletics and a silver  at the same event in 2007. He represented his country in that event at the 2001 World Championships in Athletics.

As a young athlete, he was among the most promising runners of his generation, having own gold medals at the South American Youth Championships in Athletics and the South American Junior Championships in Athletics. His winning time of 1:48.53 minutes for the 800 m at the junior competition remains a championship record, as of 2016. He won silver medals at Central American and Caribbean Junior and South American Under-23 levels. Silvera competed for his country at the 1999 World Youth Championships in Athletics and the 2000 World Junior Championships in Athletics.

Personal bests
400 metres – 46.54 min (2001)
800 metres – 1:47.26 min (2004)

International competitions

National titles
Venezuelan Athletics Championships
800 m: 1999, 2000, 2001, 2003, 2005

References

External links

Living people
1982 births
Venezuelan male middle-distance runners
Venezuelan male sprinters
World Athletics Championships athletes for Venezuela
Athletes (track and field) at the 2003 Pan American Games
Pan American Games competitors for Venezuela
Competitors at the 2006 Central American and Caribbean Games
20th-century Venezuelan people
21st-century Venezuelan people